Skålevik is an urban village area on the northern part of the island of Flekkerøya in the municipality of Kristiansand in Agder county, Norway. The village is located within the borough of Vågsbygd.

References

Villages in Agder
Geography of Kristiansand